Pipers Row tram stop is an under construction tram stop on the Wolverhampton railway station  extension of Line 1 of the West Midlands Metro. Taking its name from the street it is to be built on, it will serve the Wolverhampton bus station. It had been planned to open in September 2020 once the rebuilding of the railway station was complete, but this has now been pushed back to spring 2023.

References

West Midlands Metro stops